Alura In-Ze is a character appearing in media published by DC Comics, usually those involving Superman. Alura is the Kryptonian daughter of In-Zee, wife of Zor-El, mother of Supergirl, and paternal aunt (by marriage) of Superman. Created by writer Otto Binder and artist Al Plastino, the character first appeared in Action Comics #252 (May 1959).

The character has appeared in media adaptations of the Superman and Supergirl comics, including live-action films, television programs and video games.

Alura was portrayed by Mia Farrow in the 1984 film Supergirl. In the first two seasons of the Arrowverse series Supergirl, Laura Benanti portrayed Alura until Erica Durance took over the role.

Publication history
The character Alura appeared unnamed in Action Comics #252 (May 1959) as part of the origin of Supergirl (Kara Zor-El). She was created by Otto Binder and Al Plastino. Her role was similar to that of what Lara was to Superman. She and her husband, Zor-El, send her to a spaceship from Argo City to Earth to survive.

Fictional character biography

Pre-Crisis

Earth-One
In pre-Crisis continuity, Alura supported her husband Zor-El, one of the only scientists to believe his older brother Jor-El's predictions about the impending destruction of Krypton. When the planet exploded, Argo City was somehow blown safely into space with a life-giving bubble of air around it (a later version of the story in Action Comics #316 (September 1964) has the city saved by a weather dome that Zor-El had constructed). The explosion had turned the ground beneath Argo City into Kryptonite, but Alura, Zor-El and the other survivors covered the surface with sheets of lead. The Kryptonians managed to keep alive for many years, and Kara was born a number of years after the destruction of Krypton. The end for Argo City came during Kara's teens when a meteor storm punched holes into the lead sheeting, exposing the survivors to the deadly kryptonite radiation. Zor-El had managed to build a rocket and now used it to send his daughter to Earth. Alura provided Kara a costume based closely on Superman's own.
It was later revealed to Supergirl through Zor-El induced dreams that he and Alura had teleported away into the Survival Zone (similar to the Phantom Zone) during Argo's final moments. Supergirl was able to rescue them in Action Comics #310 (March 1964), and Zor-El and Alura went on to live in Kandor. When the bottle city was enlarged, Zor-El and Alura resettled on New Krypton/Rokyn.

Earth-Two
In the alternate universe of Earth-Two, Allura In-Z (note different spelling) is married to Zor-L, and they send their daughter Kara Zor-L to Earth Two where she becomes Power Girl. This Zor-L was an expert in psychology, and created a virtual reality chamber for Kara inside her spacecraft. As she aged inside the rocket on her way to Earth-Two, she experienced the type of life she would have had on Krypton with Allura and Zor-L. Zor-L and Allura were killed when Krypton exploded. This version of Allura lived in Kandor and not Argo City. Allura only made one appearance, in Showcase #98 (March 1978).

Post-Crisis
In "The Supergirl from Krypton" story-arc in Superman/Batman #8-13 (May–October 2004), Alura and Zor-El rocketed their daughter away from Krypton before Kal-El left. It was expected that she would reach Earth first and could help raise Kal from his infancy. However, she stayed in stasis and her ship did not reach Earth until years later, so the infant she expected to help raise was a grown man when she arrived still in her teens.

After Lex Luthor uses Black Kryptonite to split Kara into good and evil parts, the evil Kara claims that Zor-El actually sent his daughter to Earth to kill his nephew, since he resented his older brother and hated the idea of Jor-El's lineage continuing past Krypton's destruction. This tied together and explained fragmented flashbacks that had suggested Zor-El was a villainous character, including his dismissal of schoolchildren taunting Kara as "the dead" (they had already been possessed) and Alura telling Kara to kill her and "make your father proud" (she had also been possessed by Phantoms from the Phantom Zone, and this was not a taunt but a genuine request from what remained of her original personality) as well as the original idea that he wanted Kara to kill Kal-El. As the story ended, it was revealed that the house of El was cursed by the phantoms as they saw them as their jailers. Wherever one of the El blood line went, the Phantoms would follow. To save Earth, he needed to send Kara to remove Kal and stop the El blood line from ever growing. At the end of this story arc, however, it was revealed that the images of Zor-El and the Phantoms subsequently invading Earth as predicted were all a ruse by the Monitors to see if Supergirl belonged in the New Earth universe. Upon discovering she was truly that universe's Supergirl she was left to her own devices to reconcile with all the people she harmed in the wake of the "test". The Monitor does, however, assert that the memories of Zor-El and the phantoms on Krypton were nevertheless real.

A subsequent flashback in issue #24 apparently contradicts the Monitor, revealing that "New Earth" Zor-El was not a scientist, although Alura was. In current continuity, Zor-El was a Ranger, and got on well with his brother. With his encouragement, Alura designed the ship that sent Kara to Earth, as both Kal-El's protector and the last living being who remembered Krypton (since Kal-El was an infant).

In Action Comics #869 it is revealed that Alura saved Argo City from Krypton's destruction by engineering a protective dome with her husband Zor-El. However, Brainiac who was the culprit for Krypton's explosion, returned to finish the job. He merged Argo with the Bottle City of Kandor and killed those he considered to be duplicate information. Superman finds the city in Brainiac's ship. Zor-El and Alura are able to make contact with Kal-El to enquire about their daughter. The Bottle City of Kandor reverts to its full size in the North Pole at the end of the "Brainiac" story arc, which leads directly into "New Krypton".

A rather minor character historically, Alura has a major role in the on-going "Superman: New Krypton" storyline. She is shown not to trust Earth people, and does not approve of her daughter or nephew's choices. Zor-El is a voice of reason to her, and when he is murdered by Reactron, she is beside herself with grief and anger. After Zor-El's death she takes command over the Kandorian people, putting as many Superman's enemies as she can in the Phantom Zone and waging war over the human race in retribution for Reactron's attack. When a coalition of human heroes, led by Superman, manages to stop her plan de-powering some of the Kryptonian Army, Alura uses Kryptonian Sunstones to turn Kandor into a new planet, the so-called "New Krypton" and put it into orbit around the Sun, at the opposite side of Earth. It is later revealed that she freed General Zod to help manage the planet and lead its military.

As part of his participation in Project 7734 (a covert U.S. military operation dedicated to neutralizing the Kryptonians), Luthor sends a robot double of himself with Brainiac on an mission to attack New Krypton. While there, the Luthor robot tampers with the body chemistry of the previously captured Reactron. Shortly thereafter, Reactron kills himself, initiating a chain reaction which ultimately destroys New Krypton and all but seven thousand of its 100,000 Kryptonian inhabitants. Alura, who was at ground zero, is among the casualties.

Powers and abilities
Alura In-Ze has all the powers and weaknesses of a Kryptonian from exposure to Earth's yellow sunlight.

In other media

Television
 Alura appears along with her husband Zor-El in the Super Friends episode "The Krypton Syndrome".
 Alura appears in Supergirl, portrayed initially by Laura Benanti in season one and two, and later by Erica Durance in season 3 and 5. This version is a member of the Kryptonian Science Council. She also has a twin sister named General Astra (also portrayed by Benanti), one of the primary antagonists of season one (alongside her husband Non) who was part of the attempted coup d'état and now is trying to take over Earth, while convincing Kara that she is doing it for the good of the planet. In season three, Supergirl discovers that Alura is still alive and is part of Argo City's High Council. Her late husband Zor-El built a fail-safe around Argo City to protect it from Krypton's explosion.
 Alura appears in the DC Super Hero Girls episode "#DCSuperHeroBoys", voiced by Kari Wahlgren. She is part of the Council member where she faces General Zod, Ursa and Non when Krypton is being collapsed, until sentencing them to the Phantom Zone. She later reunites with her daughter Kara to send her to Earth.

Film
 Alura appears in the film Supergirl, portrayed by Mia Farrow.
 Alura appears in Superman/Batman: Apocalypse during a opening flashback of Kara escaping Krypton.
 Alura appears in Superman: Unbound, voiced by Sirena Irwin. Superman visits her and Zor-El in Kandor to ask them what they know about Brainiac.
 Alura appears in DC Super Hero Girls: Hero of the Year, voiced by April Stewart.

Video games
Alura appears in the video game Injustice 2, voiced by Grey DeLisle.

References

Characters created by Otto Binder
Comics characters introduced in 1959
DC Comics extraterrestrial superheroes
DC Comics characters who can move at superhuman speeds
DC Comics characters with accelerated healing
DC Comics characters with superhuman senses
DC Comics characters with superhuman strength
DC Comics female characters
Fictional female scientists
Kryptonians
Superman characters
Fictional characters with absorption or parasitic abilities
Fictional characters with air or wind abilities
Fictional characters with energy-manipulation abilities
Fictional characters with fire or heat abilities
Fictional characters with ice or cold abilities
Fictional characters with nuclear or radiation abilities
Fictional characters with slowed ageing
Fictional characters with superhuman durability or invulnerability
Fictional characters with X-ray vision

pt:Alura
vi:Alura